The 2002 Rose Bowl, played on January 3, 2002, was a college football bowl game. It was the 88th Rose Bowl game and was the BCS National Championship Game of the 2001 college football season.  The game featured the Miami Hurricanes and the Nebraska Cornhuskers, marking the first time since the 1919 Rose Bowl, and only the third time in the game's history, that neither the Big Ten nor the Pac-10 Conferences had a representative in this game. The Hurricanes won the game, 37–14, for their fifth national title. Miami quarterback Ken Dorsey and wide receiver Andre Johnson were named the Rose Bowl Players of the Game.

Teams

Because the Rose Bowl was hosting the BCS Championship game, as part of the agreement begun in the 1998 season, the Tournament of Roses committee would get the number one and number two ranked teams in the Bowl Championship Series system. However, this was actually the third Rose Bowl number one versus two pairing, with the first two in the 1963 and 1969 games.

Nebraska Cornhuskers and Miami Hurricanes

In yet another controversial season for the BCS, No. 4 Nebraska was chosen as a national title contender despite not having played in the Big 12 championship game. The Huskers went into their last regularly scheduled game at Colorado undefeated, but were beaten by Colorado 62–36. The Huskers dropped from No. 2 to No. 6 in the wire service polls. In the ensuing days, No. 2 Florida lost to Tennessee, the Colorado Buffaloes went on to win the Big 12 Championship Game over No. 3 Texas, and in the SEC Championship Game, No. 2 Tennessee was stunned by LSU. This left Miami as the undefeated and undisputed No. 1 team in the country but a host of other teams vying for #2. The BCS computers did not take into account at which point a team's loss came during the season. There were also components for strength of schedule, quality win, and margin of victory. With this calculation, one-loss Nebraska came out ahead of two-loss Colorado and one-loss, second-ranked Oregon.

Previously, Nebraska had appeared in the 1941 Rose Bowl in a 21–13 loss to Stanford. This was the first appearance for the Miami Hurricanes in the Rose Bowl.

Pac-10 and Big Ten
Oregon was the champion of the Pacific-10 Conference and was ranked No. 2 in the AP Poll. They were selected for the 2002 Fiesta Bowl, where they faced No. 3 ranked Colorado, who was No. 4 in the BCS poll. The Illinois Fighting Illini, ranked No. 8 in the BCS, won the Big Ten Conference championship and were picked for the 2002 Sugar Bowl.

Scoring summary

Aftermath
Oregon defeated Colorado in the 2002 Fiesta Bowl. In the final AP poll, Miami was the unanimous No. 1 team, Oregon was #2. The next time that the Rose Bowl hosted the BCS championship, the 2006 Rose Bowl, the USC Trojans would be a participant. The 2002 contest was the last one not to feature a team from either the Big Ten or Pacific-10 until the 2018 Rose Bowl, which was a component of the College Football Playoff and pitted Georgia against Oklahoma.

The game, which was played on a Thursday night, two days after the parade, has been remembered as a low point for the Rose Bowl. University of Michigan coach Bo Schembechler remarked, "Didn't watch it," when asked what he thought of the 2002 Rose Bowl.

The 2002 Rose Bowl was the first broadcast not set at the traditional 2:00pm West Coast time. The visual of the afternoon sun setting on the San Gabriel Mountains on New Year's Day is recognized as an important part of the tradition of the game.

References

Rose Bowl
Rose Bowl Game
BCS National Championship Game
Miami Hurricanes football bowl games
Nebraska Cornhuskers football bowl games
January 2002 sports events in the United States
Rose
21st century in Pasadena, California